George Lynch (born September 28, 1954) is an American guitarist, best known for his work with the hard rock band Dokken and his post-Dokken solo band Lynch Mob. He is considered to be one of the most famous and influential 1980s metal guitarists and is known for his unique playing style and sound. He is ranked No. 47 on "100 Greatest Guitarists of All Time" by Guitar World magazine and No. 10 on "Top 10 Metal Guitarists of All Time" by Gibson.

Early life
Lynch was born in Spokane, Washington and made the small town of Auburn, California his home base between 1971 and 1975.

Career

1970s 
Twice Lynch auditioned for the position of Ozzy Osbourne's lead guitarist — once in 1979, losing to Randy Rhoads. Lynch said "I won the consolation prize. Randy got to tour with Ozzy...and I got to teach at his mom's school."— He auditioned again in 1982 to replace Brad Gillis. According to Lynch, he was hired for three days before Osbourne changed his mind and decided to go with Jake E. Lee. Lee noted that Lynch "got the gig, but only went on the road for two weeks to watch the show and never actually played with Ozzy." Lynch stated in an interview that he played soundchecks at the side of the stage on a European tour with Osbourne and Brad Gillis as part of an extensive audition. He also rehearsed with the band in Texas but was let go by Osbourne as the band moved operations to Los Angeles. Jake E. Lee auditioned on the day of Lynch's dismissal and while Lee admittedly didn't play well the day of the audition he looked the part and was offered the gig. Osbourne fired Lynch on the spot in front of Lee, whom Lynch had just met. Lynch was devastated and was struggling financially in those years. He had been working as a delivery man for a liquor store and was required by his employer to have short hair. Sharon Osbourne fancied Lee's "look" over Lynch's playing and her influence likely finalized Osbourne's decision to hire Lee.

Lynch played in a late 1970s band called The Boyz, working the Sunset Strip clubs in Hollywood alongside Van Halen and Quiet Riot. The Boyz also featured future Dokken drummer Mick Brown, bassist Monte Zufelt and vocalists Lisa Furspanker and Greg Sanford. Their sound and Lynch's playing were so similar to Van Halen that one of their demos was circulated as a "pre-Roth Van Halen recording". The Boyz were set to play a showcase for Gene Simmons and his startup label but Van Halen opened the show and Simmons opted not to stay and see The Boyz. Lynch subsequently formed Xciter before joining Dokken.

Dokken and Lynch Mob

Dokken had a string of successful platinum albums that prominently featured Lynch's inventive lead guitar work. The instrumental track "Mr. Scary" on Back for the Attack contributed to his popularity among guitar players. The band earned a Grammy nomination for Best Metal Performance in 1990.

The group parted ways in March 1989 due to internal tensions with lead vocalist Don Dokken. Lynch formed his own hard rock band Lynch Mob, which differed from Dokken in lyrical and guitar complexity, subject matter, song structure, and tuning. Lynch took time off when his wife Christy Lynch had a baby girl, Mariah Lynch.

Lynch released his first solo album Sacred Groove in 1993.

After Don Dokken, Jeff Pilson and Mick Brown reunited in 1994 they decided to bring Lynch back as well for a true reunion of Dokken. The reunited version of Dokken was signed to the Columbia/Sony label and after extensive writing released Dysfunctional. The album did not do as well as expected and the band was dropped from the label. Dokken then signed on with CMC International and released an "unplugged" show performed in late 1994 titled One Live Night.

The band entered the studio in 1996 with producer Kelly Gray who wanted to take Dokken in a new direction. To the dismay of vocalist and founder Don Dokken the resulting Shadowlife was a complete switch from melodic rock to a more alternative sound.

Tensions again flared between Don Dokken and Lynch in 1997, leading to Lynch being replaced by former Europe guitarist John Norum. This prompted Lynch to reunite Lynch Mob which entered the studio and demoed three songs later released as an EP titled Syzygy. Band member Logan decided to pursue other projects before a full album could be completed. Mick Brown decided to stay with Dokken. Lynch organized a short 13 show U.S. tour for Lynch Mob in 1998 with Artension frontman John West, Anthony Esposito and others.

When that lineup dissolved, Lynch decided to take Lynch Mob in a totally new direction. The Lynch Mob's radical new look, new lineup and musical approach attracted a younger audience. They released the album Smoke This in 1999. After the supporting tour Lynch decided to put Lynch Mob on hold for a couple years, but not before he toured with Lynch Mob's original singer Oni Logan, L.A. Guns' bassist Chuck Garric, and BulletBoys' drummer Jimmy D'Anda in late 2001.

Post-2001 projects
Lynch began working with producer/engineer Sean Fodor on the ill-fated Microdot project which featured then-unknown vocalist London LeGrand in early 2002 Only a few songs from that project have been released: "Bulldog Tyranny" on The Lost Anthology and three other songs Lynch later released as The Lynch That Stole Riffness with Robert Mason taking the helm on vocals.

Lynch reformed Lynch Mob in late 2002 with original bassist Anthony Esposito as well as Robert Mason. Lynch Mob recorded an album of re-recorded classic Lynch songs from Dokken and Lynch Mob, updated to a more contemporary (post-2000) approach and sound.

Lynch formed a project with former Dokken bassist Jeff Pilson, releasing the Wicked Underground album in 2003 under the name Lynch/Pilson. That same year, Lynch put together The George Lynch Group with which he has continued to record and regularly tour. The George Lynch Group performed a marathon 26 shows in 30 days including a much talked about feature on The Tonight Show with Jay Leno. This line-up featured Lynch, vocalist Andrew Freeman, drummer Vinny Appice (Black Sabbath, Dio), and Mårten Andersson (Lizzy Borden, Starwood, Legacy). The 2005 Furious George album is a cover album, including classic rock tunes from ZZ Top, Jimi Hendrix, The Beatles, AC/DC, and Led Zeppelin.

Let the Truth Be Known was released under the band name Souls of We in 2008 and features the line-up of: London LeGrand (vocals), Johnny Chow (bass), and Yael (drums) and a myriad of guest contributions.

Lynch embarked on a tour in the early fall of 2008 with a reformed Lynch Mob featuring original singer Oni Logan, bassist Marco Mendoza and drummer Scot Coogan. A new Lynch Mob album, titled Smoke and Mirrors, was released in October 2009 with Logan handling lead vocals.

Lynch recorded lead and rhythm guitar tracks in 2009 for seven songs that appear on the debut album of rock singer Raven Quinn. The self-published album was released March 4, 2010.

Lynch toured the spring of 2010 with Souls of We and spent the summer and winter touring with Lynch Mob. In the summer of 2010 Souls of We changed their line-up and were forced to discontinue with the name.

Lynch appeared on a tribute album Siam Shade Tribute, for Japanese rock band Siam Shade in 2010.

Lynch currently lives near Los Angeles where he created an instructional guitar website The Guitar Dojo.

Lynch produces his own custom hand-built art guitars, marketed under the Mr. Scary Guitars brand, which he makes himself at the ESP Guitars USA custom shop facility.

Second Dokken Reunion and T&N
George Lynch and Jeff Pilson joined Mick Brown and Don Dokken for two songs during an encore at a Dokken show at The House of Blues in Anaheim on November 29, 2009. Lynch subsequently announced a reunion of Dokken's "glory days" line-up but the announcement was retracted on February 24. Lynch released a statement on his website claiming that Don did not want the reunion to occur.

T&N was formed from 3/4 of the classic Dokken line-up: Lynch, Jeff Pilson, and Mick Brown. They announced plans for a studio album to be released in 2012. The trio's original name was Tooth & Nail but Tooth & Nail was shortened to T&N in March 2012. The band released the album Slave to the Empire on October 31, 2012.

Recent activities
Lynch announced plans for a documentary movie: Shadowtrain: Under A Crooked Sky about the destruction of the Native American community in the fall of 2011. A crowd-funding campaign was launched in March 2013 to complete the project. The movie was still a work in progress as of late 2014 .

Lynch put together Shadowtrain featuring documentary filmmaker and drummer Vincent Nicastro, Pueblo Native American vocalist Gregg Analla (Tribe of Gypsies, Slaviour, Seventhsign), ex-Lynch Mob bassist Gabe Rosales, and keyboardist Donnie Dickman.

Lynch's all-star project with vocalist/bassist Doug Pinnick and drummer Ray Luzier known as KXM released its debut in 2014.

Lynch announced another project: The Infidels, with Pancho Tomaselli, Sal Rodriguez, and rapper Sen Dog.

Lynch completed an album with Stryper frontman Michael Sweet, Only to Rise, released on January 27, 2015, on Frontiers Records under the name Sweet & Lynch. The recording- line-up features James Lomenzo and Brian Tichy on bass and drums. The duo released a second album Unified, on November 10, 2017.

Lynch teamed up with Living Colour vocalist Corey Glover to form the side project Ultraphonix, releasing the album Original Human Music in 2018.

In 2019, Lynch reunited with former Dokken bassist Jeff Pilson in the band The End Machine. The band released their self-titled debut in 2019 and released their second album, The End Machine:Phase 2 in 2021. According to a 2021 interview with Pariah Burke, the band is an intentional return to Lynch's classic sound.
In 2020 the Dirty Shirley album was released with two singles preceding.

Equipment

Lynch used Charvel and Kramer guitars prior to 1986, most notably their tiger stripe guitars. Lynch has endorsed ESP Guitars since then His unique "Skull and Bones" guitar (affectionately named "Mom") was designed and hand-crafted by artist John 'J. Frog' Garcia. Since George was contracted by ESP at the time, an ESP decal was applied to the headstock. Several George Lynch signature guitars have been produced by ESP Japan:

 The ESP Kamikaze model, based on his first ESP guitar
 The Tiger model, a homemade Strat constructed from a stock of parts George bought from Charvel in the 1980s
 The Skull & Snakes, a design later used for the Lynch Mob "Wicked Sensation" album artwork
 The Flame Boy, based on an ESP Forest design
 The New Super V, which includes distressed hardware and features and a new "Super V" pickup
 The Ultra Tone, the first ESP guitar that George designed himself
 The Serpent, an ESP model released and used in the 1990s

Lynch briefly endorsed PRS Guitars in the early 1990s. He can be seen using two different colored Custom 24 models. He also endorsed the hand-crafted Yamaha L-Series Acoustic Guitars and used these on the Asian 'Unplugged' Clinic tour May/June 2006.

Lynch is presently signed with ESP Guitars, which has resulted in ESP's creation of the Lynch Jumbo acoustic, featuring graphics designed by Stephen Jensen.

Lynch's use of Marshall, Soldano, Bogner & Diezel amps and effects units to achieve his famous tone is well documented in rock guitar circles. His rig changes with each successive tour. Lynch used the Randall Dragon (non-master volume) tube head for the majority of his sound while on tour in 2005. The design was similar to the older Marshall Plexi heads he used early in the Dokken era.

Lynch is a long-time endorser of Randall Amplification and participated in the design of the George Lynch Box for Randall's modular amp system.

Seymour Duncan created the Screamin' Demon guitar pickup (SH-12 and TB-12) for Lynch, which is featured on all the ESP Lynch signature guitars. Seymour Duncan also recently designed the new Super V pickup to be featured in the Super V model.

Lynch also uses a Morley A/B box called the Tripler and a limited edition Robert Keeley GL Time Machine boost.

Zoom released the G2g George Lynch Pedal in 2008.

Lynch designed a new high-nickel content-string through the Dean Markley company with his name on the packaging.

Influences 
Lynch cited Jimi Hendrix, Randy Rhoads, Jeff Beck and Michael Schenker, along with Eddie Van Halen, Allan Holdsworth, Jan Akkerman, Christopher Parkening, Al Di Meola, Roy Buchanan, Albert King, Frank Marino, Muddy Waters, Gary Moore and Yngwie Malmsteen as his musical influences.

Discography 

Dokken
 Breaking the Chains (1981)
 Tooth and Nail (1984)
 Under Lock and Key (1985)
 Back for the Attack (1987)
 Beast from the East (1988)
 Dysfunctional (1995)
 One Live Night (1996)
 Shadowlife (1997)
 From Conception: Live 1981 (2007)
 Return to the East Live (2016)
 The Lost Songs: 1978—1981 (2020)

Lynch Mob
 Wicked Sensation (1990)
 Lynch Mob (1992)
 Syzygy (1998)
 Smoke This (1999)
 Evil: Live (2003)
 REvolution (2003)
 REvolution: Live! (2006)
 Smoke and Mirrors (2009)
 Sound Mountain Sessions (2012)
 Unplugged: Live from Sugarhill Studios (2013)
 Sun Red Sun (2014)
 Rebel (2015)
 The Brotherhood (2017)

Solo
 Sacred Groove (1993)
 Will Play for Food (2000)
 Stone House (2001)
 The Lynch That Stole Riffness! (2002)
 Furious George (2004)
 The Lost Anthology (2005)
 Guitar Slinger (2007)
 Scorpion Tales (2008)
 Orchestral Mayhem (2010)
 Kill All Control (2011)
 Legacy EP (2012)
 Shadow Train (2015)
 Seamless (2021)

Udo LindenbergKeule (1982)

Hear 'n Aid
 Stars (1986)

Tony MacAlpine
 Maximum Security (1987)

Lynch/Pilson
 Wicked Underground (2003)Heavy Hitters (2020)

Xciter
 Xciter (2006)

Lana Lane
 Gemini (2006)

Souls of We
 Let the Truth Be Known (2008)

George Lynch & The Stahlwerksinfonie Orchestra
 Christmas / Sarajevo (2009)

Raven Quinn
 Raven Quinn (2010)

Willie Basse 
 Break AwayT&N
 Slave to the Empire (2012)

KXM
 KXM (2014)
 Scatterbrain (2017)
 Circle of Dolls (2019)

Sweet & LynchOnly to Rise (2015)Unified (2017)

Project NfidelikahProject Nfidelikah (2016)

Ultraphonix Original Human Music (2018)

The End MachineThe End Machine (2019)The End Machine:Phase 2 (2021)

Dirty ShirleyDirty Shirley'' (2020)

References

External links 
Official George Lynch website
Official Mr. Scary Guitars website
Official George Lynch Facebook fanpage
Official Lynch Mob Facebook page
Official KXM Facebook page
Official Shadowtrain Facebook page
Official Dokken website
George Lynch Fan Forum
2015 George Lynch Interview on MusiciansChannel.com
NAMM Oral History Interview January 26, 2013

1954 births
American heavy metal guitarists
Dokken members
Glam metal musicians
Living people
Lynch Mob (band) members
Musicians from Sacramento, California
Musicians from Spokane, Washington
Lead guitarists
Guitarists from Arizona
People from Auburn, California
Guitarists from Washington (state)
American male guitarists
20th-century American guitarists
Souls of We members
Guitarists from California
20th-century American male musicians